Sidra  is a village in Sokółka County, Podlaskie Voivodeship, in north-eastern Poland. It is the seat of the gmina (administrative district) called Gmina Sidra.

The village has a population of 730.  A Jewish population of 455 existed in 1921. The wooden synagogue built at the turn of the 17th & 18th centuries was burned down by the Germans in 1942.

References

Villages in Sokółka County
Trakai Voivodeship
Sokolsky Uyezd
Białystok Voivodeship (1919–1939)
Belastok Region